SMS Elbing was a light cruiser ordered by the Imperial Russian navy under the name Admiral Nevelskoy from the Schichau-Werke shipyard in Danzig in 1913. Following the outbreak of World War I, the ship was confiscated in August 1914 and launched on 21 November 1914 as SMS Elbing. She had one sister ship, the lead ship of their class. The ship was commissioned into the High Seas Fleet in September 1915.

Elbing participated in only two major operations during her career. The first, the bombardment of Yarmouth and Lowestoft, occurred in April 1916; there, she briefly engaged the British Harwich Force. A month later, she took part in the Battle of Jutland, where she scored the first hit of the engagement. She was heavily engaged in the confused fighting on the night of 31 May – 1 June, and shortly after midnight she was accidentally rammed by the battleship , which tore a hole in the ship's hull. Flooding disabled the ship's engines and electrical generators, rendering her immobilized and without power. At around 02:00, a German torpedo boat took off most of her crew, and an hour later the remaining men scuttled the ship; they escaped in the ship's cutter and were later picked up by a Dutch steamer.

Design

She displaced  at full load. Her propulsion system consisted of two sets of Marine steam turbines driving two  propellers. They were designed to give . These were powered by six coal-fired Yarrow water-tube boilers, and four oil-fired Yarrow boilers. Elbing had a standard crew of twenty-one officers and 421 enlisted men, though this was expanded in wartime.

The ship was armed with eight  SK L/45 guns in single pedestal mounts. Two were placed side by side forward on the forecastle, four were located amidships, two on either side, and two were side by side aft. She also carried four  SK L/55 anti-aircraft guns, though these were replaced with a pair of two  SK L/45 anti-aircraft guns. She was also equipped with a pair of  torpedo tubes mounted on the deck. She could also carry 120 mines.

Service history
Elbing was ordered by the Imperial Russian Navy as Admiral Nevelskoy from the Schichau-Werke shipyard in Danzig. She was laid down in 1913, requisitioned by the German Navy on 5 August 1914, and was renamed Elbing. She was launched on 21 November 1914, after which fitting-out work commenced. She was commissioned into the High Seas Fleet on 4 September 1915.

After her commissioning, Elbing was assigned to II Scouting Group, which typically operated alongside the battlecruisers of I Scouting Group. Her first major operation was the bombardment of Yarmouth and Lowestoft on 24–25 April. On the approach to Lowestoft, Elbing and  spotted the Harwich Force, a squadron of three light cruisers and eighteen destroyers, approaching the German formation from the south at 04:50. Rear Admiral Friedrich Boedicker, the German commander, initially ordered his battlecruisers to continue with the bombardment, while Elbing and the other five light cruisers concentrated to engage the Harwich Force. At around 05:30, the British and German light forces clashed, firing mostly at long range. The battlecruisers arrived on the scene at 05:47, prompting the British squadron to retreat at high speed. A light cruiser and destroyer were damaged before Boedicker broke off the engagement after receiving reports of submarines in the area.

Battle of Jutland

In May 1916, Admiral Reinhard Scheer, the fleet commander, planned to lure a portion of the British fleet away from its bases and destroy it with the entire High Seas Fleet. Elbing remained in II Scouting Group, attached to I Scouting Group, for the operation. The squadron left the Jade roadstead at 02:00 on 31 May, bound for the waters of the Skagerrak. The main body of the fleet followed an hour and a half later. At 15:00, lookouts on Elbing spotted the Danish steamer N. J. Fjord; Elbing detached a pair of torpedo boats to investigate the steamer. Elbing turned to support the destroyers, opening fire at 15:32. She quickly scored the first hit of the battle, on Galatea, though the shell failed to explode. The British turned to the north back toward the 1st Battlecruiser Squadron, with Elbing still firing at long range. About fifteen minutes later, the three cruisers engaged a seaplane launched by the seaplane tender . They failed to score any hits, but the aircraft was forced off after which its engine broke down and it was forced to land. The three cruisers then returned to their stations ahead of the German battlecruisers.

At around 18:30, Elbing and the rest of II Scouting Group encountered the cruiser ; they opened fire and scored several hits on the ship. As both sides' cruisers disengaged, Rear Admiral Horace Hood's three battlecruisers intervened. His flagship  scored a hit on Wiesbaden that exploded in her engine room and disabled the ship. Elbing and Frankfurt each fired a torpedo at the British battlecruisers, though both missed. Elbing was briefly engaged by the battlecruisers at very long range, though she was not hit. At around 20:15, Elbing lost her port engine due to leaks in her boiler condensers.

II Scouting Group, along with the battlecruisers  and  had been ordered to take station ahead of the German line for its night cruising formation. Elbing was still having problems with her boiler condensers, and was unable to keep up the speed necessary to reach the front of the line, and so she fell in with IV Scouting Group. At 23:15, Elbing and  spotted the British cruiser  and several destroyers. They used the British recognition signal and closed to  before turning on their searchlights and opening fire. Castor was hit seven times and set on fire, forcing the British to turn away. As they did, they fired several torpedoes at Elbing and Hamburg. One passed underneath Elbing but failed to explode. While this engagement was still on-going, the 2nd Light Cruiser Squadron arrived and engaged IV Scouting Group. Elbing was hit once, which destroyed her wireless transmitting station and killed four men and wounded twelve.

Shortly after midnight, the German fleet ran into the British rear destroyer screen. Elbing was by this time steaming on the port side of the German line along with Hamburg and Rostock. The British destroyers launched a torpedo attack, which forced the three cruisers to turn to starboard to avoid them. This pointed the cruisers directly at the German line. Posen turned hard to starboard, but still collided with Elbings starboard quarter. The cruiser was holed below the waterline, which flooded the starboard engine room first. She initially took on a list of eighteen degrees, which allowed water to spread to the port engine room. With the engines shut down, steam began to condense in the pipes, which disabled the electric generators and caused the ship to lose electrical power. As water spread throughout the ship's engine compartments, the list was reduced. The ship was completely immobilized, though she was not in danger of sinking.

At 02:00, the torpedo boat  came alongside and took off 477 officers and men of Elbings crew. Her commander and a small group of officers and men remained on board. They rigged an improvised sail in an attempt to bring the ship closer to shore, but at around 03:00, British destroyers were spotted to the south and the order to scuttle the ship was given. They then lowered the ship's cutter into the water and set off; while steaming back to port, they rescued the surgeon from the destroyer . At around 07:00, a Dutch trawler met the cutter and took the men to Holland. In the course of the Battle of Jutland, Elbing had fired 230 rounds of 15 cm ammunition and a single torpedo. Four of her crew were killed and twelve more were wounded.

Footnotes

References

Further reading
 

Pillau-class cruisers
Ships built in Danzig
1914 ships
World War I cruisers of Germany
Maritime incidents in 1916
Ships sunk at the Battle of Jutland
Ships built by Schichau